Mambéré-Kadéï is one of the 16 prefectures of the Central African Republic. The prefecture covers 30,203 km2 and had a population of 289,688 as of the 2003 census, giving a population density of less than 10 inhabitants/km2. Its capital is Berbérati.

Until 1992, it was known as Haute-Sangha.

References

 Provinces of the CAR; lists name changes including Haute-Sangha

 
Prefectures of the Central African Republic